is a railway station on the Hakodate Main Line in Hokuto, Hokkaido, Japan, operated by the Hokkaido Railway Company (JR Hokkaido). The station – rebuilt and very extensively enlarged to serve from March 2016 as the northern terminal of the new Hokkaido Shinkansen – occupies the site of the former , and is the northernmost high-speed Shinkansen railway station in Japan.

Lines
The station, which is numbered H70, is served by trains operating on the Hakodate Main Line and the Hokkaido Shinkansen, opened in 2016.

Station Layout
Shin Hakodate Hokuto station has a total of 2 platforms serving 4 tracks on the ground level for the Hakodate Main line, and 2 side platforms on the upper level for the Hokkaido Shinkansen.

History

The station opened on 10 December 1902, named . It was renamed Oshima-Ono on 1 April 1942. With the privatization of JNR on 1 April 1987, the station came under the control of JR Hokkaido.

The station has been rebuilt and renamed , becoming a stop on the Hokkaido Shinkansen high-speed line, which opened on 26 March 2016. "Relay" shuttle services using three-car 733 series electric trains operate to and from the centrally-located Hakodate Station (approximately 18 km away).

The rebuilt station features large windows and white support pillars modeled after poplar trees near the local Trappist monastery. Ticket vending machines are located on the second floor of the structure. The inside uses a large number of locally sourced cedar lumber and Hokkaido bricks.

Since the construction of the new station, the immediate surrounding areas have been redeveloped significantly with new roads, homes and businesses.

The Hokkaido Shinkansen, connecting Honshu, Japan's main island, to the northern island of Hokkaido commenced service on 26 March 2016. Due to the line's extension to Sapporo (under construction), the Oshima-Ōno Station at Hokuto, Hokkaido, has been upgraded into the "New Hakodate-Hokuto Station," and received a bronze Fist of the North Star statue.

Future

See also
 List of railway stations in Japan

References

Railway stations in Hokkaido Prefecture
Hokkaido Shinkansen
Stations of Hokkaido Railway Company
Railway stations in Japan opened in 1902
Hokuto, Hokkaido